Anthony James Monins Whitley, FSA is a British classical archaeologist specialising in the Early Iron Age and Archaic periods of the Mediterranean world. He is currently Professor in Mediterranean Archaeology at Cardiff University. He was Director of the British School at Athens from 2002 to 2007.

Honours
Whitley was elected Fellow of the Society of Antiquaries of London (FSA) on 4 July 2002.

Selected works

References

 

 
 
 

Fellows of the Society of Antiquaries of London
British classical scholars
Classical archaeologists
Academics of Cardiff University
Living people
Directors of the British School at Athens
Year of birth missing (living people)